Elections to Hyndburn Borough Council were held on 7 May 1998.  One third of the council was up for election and the Labour party stayed in overall control of the council.

After the election, the composition of the council was
Labour 35
Conservative 12

Election result

Ward results

References
"Council poll results", The Guardian 9 May 1998 page 16
We'll take over in 1999, says Tory leader
Election results: Hyndburn

1998 English local elections
1998
1990s in Lancashire